Seán McCaughey (Irish: Seán Mac Eóchaidh)  (1915 – 11 May 1946) was an Irish Republican Army leader in the 1930s and 1940s and hunger striker.

Background

McCaughey was born in Aughnacloy, County Tyrone in 1915 and in 1921 his family moved to Ardoyne in Belfast. McCaughey was Adjutant-General of the IRA and Officer Commanding (O/C) of its Northern Command. McCaughey was held in high regard and was considered to be one of the best officers of the northern IRA. At the time of his arrest in Rathmines, Dublin on 2 September 1941 he was acting Chief of Staff.

Trial and Imprisonment

In September 1941 he was found guilty by a Dublin court of having detained and assaulted Stephen Hayes, IRA Chief of Staff who was accused of being a spy for the Irish Free State government. McCaughey was sentenced to death by firing squad. His sentence was commuted to a life sentence of penal servitude.

Imprisoned in Portlaoise Prison (24 July 1941), McCaughey refused to wear prison clothes, was kept in solitary confinement and spent nearly five years naked except for a blanket. This form of resistance by Irish Republican prisoners was used in the 1980s Blanket protest in the Maze prison (also known as "Long Kesh") and the HM Prison Armagh (women's prison) in Northern Ireland. McCaughey and other Irish Republican prisoners endured years of hardships: "Sitting month after month, year after year in bleak solitary cells, they were taken out once a week for a bath, and for the rest of the week lived the life of an animal trapped in a burrow...That they did not go mad is a remarkable comment on mans capacity for survival."

McCaughey commenced a hunger strike on 19 April 1946. After 10 days, he stopped taking water and died on 11 May 1946, the twenty-third day of his protest. An inquest was held in the prison at which the prison doctor admitted that during his four and a half years of imprisonment that McCaughey had never been allowed out in the fresh air or sunlight and that "he would not treat his dog the way Seán McCaughey had been treated in Portlaoise." 

Sean McCaughey was buried in a family grave in Milltown Cemetery which is under the care of the National Graves Association, Belfast.

Hunger Strikes

Seán McCaughey was the last person to die on hunger strike in the Irish state. There is a long history of hunger striking in Ireland - within the 20th century a total of 22 Irish republicans died on hunger strike with survivors suffering long term health and psychological effects. The largest hunger strike in Irish history was the 1923 Irish Hunger Strikes. Ten men died during the 1981 Irish hunger strike.

Sources
, Time Magazine, 29 September 1941.
National Graves Association
 Sean McCaughey song
SEAN McCAUGHEY mp3
 Biting at the Grave, O'Malley, Padraig, Beacon Press, Boston 1990 ISBN 0-8070-0208-9
 Pawns in the Game, Flynn, Barry (2011), Collins Press, Cork, Ireland ISBN 9781848891166

References

1915 births
1946 deaths
Irish people convicted of assault
Irish prisoners sentenced to death
Irish Republican Army (1919–1922) members
People from County Tyrone
Irish prisoners who died on hunger strike